Lê Minh Khái (born 10 December 1964) is a politician of the Communist Party of Vietnam. He is Deputy Prime Minister for General Economics in the Government of Vietnam.

References 

1964 births
Living people
People from Bạc Liêu Province
Members of the 13th Secretariat of the Communist Party of Vietnam
Members of the 12th Central Committee of the Communist Party of Vietnam
Members of the 13th Central Committee of the Communist Party of Vietnam
Government ministers of Vietnam
Deputy Prime Ministers of Vietnam